Patrycja Markowska (born 21 December 1979, Warsaw) is a Polish pop rock singer.

Career
She is a judge for The Voice of Poland.

Discography

Studio albums

Live albums

Video albums

References

External links 

 Patrycja Markowska – Official Site

1979 births
Living people
Polish pop singers
Polish rock singers
21st-century Polish singers
21st-century Polish women singers